Royston Lightning is an Australian former professional rugby league footballer who played for Herbert River Junior Rugby League, and from 1996 to 1998 for the Canberra Raiders, as a . He later played for the Mackay Cutters in the Queensland Cup. He has previously played for both Southern Suburbs (Cairns) and Queanbeyan Kangaroos in the Canberra Rugby League competition.

References

1978 births
Living people
Australian rugby league players
Canberra Raiders players
Mackay Cutters players
Place of birth missing (living people)
Rugby articles needing expert attention
Rugby league wingers